This is an incomplete list of heavy metal festivals. The genre heavy metal (or simply metal) is a subgenre of rock music that developed in the late 1960s and early 1970s, largely in the United States and the United Kingdom. With roots in blues rock and psychedelic rock, the first heavy metal bands such as Black Sabbath and Deep Purple attracted large audiences, and during the late 1960s and mid-1970s these bands and others in their genre were featured at a number of historic rock festivals. Judas Priest helped spur the genre's evolution by discarding much of its blues influence.

After the genre fused with other related genres such as punk rock in the late 1970s, bands in the new wave of British heavy metal such as Iron Maiden and Saxon followed in a similar vein. Before the end of the decade, heavy metal fans became known as "metalheads" or "headbangers", and there were festivals worldwide, both touring and stationary, dedicated to heavy metal subgenres and heavy metal itself. During the 1980s, glam metal became a commercial force, while Underground scenes and extreme subgenres of metal such as death metal and black metal remained subcultural phenomena, though they have their own dedicated festivals as well. Since the mid-1990s, popular styles have further expanded the definition of the genre.

Historical heavy metal festivals

Current heavy metal festivals

Africa

Botswana

Asia

India

Indonesia

Japan

Mongolia

Nepal

Europe

Austria

Belgium

Bulgaria

Czech Republic

Denmark

Estonia

Finland

France

Germany

Greece

Hungary

Iceland

Italy

Latvia

Lithuania

Netherlands

Norway

Poland

Portugal

Romania

Russia

Slovenia

Spain

Sweden

United Kingdom

North America

Canada

Mexico

United States

Oceania

Australia

South America

Brazil

Colombia

Tours
The following is an incomplete list of traveling metal festivals, both active and defunct:

See also

List of music festivals
Heavy metal music

References

External links 

 All Metalfest - all metal festivals around the world
 Heavy metal festivals in Europe
 Festivalticker
 Metalstorm.Net Search events
 Metal festivals in Deutschland, Österreich und der Schweiz
 Heavy Metal.nl - festivals and concerts
 Lords of Metal ezine - gig guide

 
Lists of rock festivals